USS Royal (AMc-102) was an Accentor-class coastal minesweeper acquired by the U.S. Navy for the dangerous task of removing mines from minefields laid in the water to prevent ships from passing.

Royal was laid down on 1 November 1941 by Anderson & Cristofani, San Francisco, California, launched 19 March 1942; sponsored by Miss Irma Bianchi; and placed in service on 13 April 1942.

World War II service 
Following training in the San Francisco area, Royal remained in the 12th Naval District, based at Treasure Island, California. Through the end of World War II, she operated in that district's patrol force. She was placed out of service on 30 November 1945, struck from the Navy list on 3 January 1946 and sold, via the War Shipping Administration, on 9 September 1947.

References

External links 
 NavSource Online: Mine Warfare Vessel Photo Archive - Royal (AMc 102)

 

Accentor-class minesweepers
Ships built in San Francisco
1942 ships
World War II minesweepers of the United States